Dr. D. Sudhaker Rao (born May 11, 1947) is a medical doctor at Henry Ford Hospital of Wayne County, Michigan. He specializes in bone and mineral metabolism and endocrinology, specifically in hyperparathyroidism, osteomalacia, and bone histomorphometry.

Early life 
Dr. Rao was born in the village of Dhanwada, in the Indian state of Telangana on May 11, 1947.  Due to the lack of secondary education centers in Dhanwada, he moved to Mahbubnagar for the remainder of his early education.  In the mid-1960s he moved to the capital city of Hyderabad to further his education.  Reportedly he chose to go into medicine because a family relative asked him if he was good at math, and he answered no.  Dr. Rao went on to graduate from Gandhi Medical College in 1969.  After graduation, Dr. Rao went on to work at the National Institute of Nutrition in Hyderabad where he first began to realize his interest in research.

Career 
In the early 1970s, during a doctor shortage in the United States, Dr. Rao applied for residency and was accepted into a General Surgery internship position at New York Methodist Hospital.  Later that year, he realized that his research interests were better suited for internal medicine and transferred to finish his residency at Booth Memorial Hospital in Flushing, Queens, New York.  In 1974, after finishing his medicine residency in New York, an opportunity arose at Henry Ford Hospital for a two-year clinical fellowship in Endocrinology.  It was also understood that he would continue onwards for a research fellowship under the tutelage of A. Michael Parfitt, thus beginning a lifelong mentorship.  After completing his clinical and research fellowship, he joined the staff of Henry Ford Hospital in 1977, and remains on staff to this day.  He now lives in Oakland Township in the northern suburbs of Detroit.

Recognition 
Dr. Rao is the current section head of the Bone & Mineral Division within the division of Endocrinology at Henry Ford Hospital.  He also serves as the director of the Bone & Mineral Research Laboratory, a laboratory rich in history.  Harold Frost, one of the foremost researchers in bone biology, developed some of his major theories in bone medicine in this laboratory.

Dr. Rao has contributed extensively to the broad field of bone & mineral metabolism. His main research interests are the role of vitamin D and calcium nutrition in parathyroid disorders and bone health. He has contributed more than 100 peer reviewed original papers, 100 symposium proceedings, abstracts, and letters to the editor, and 10 book chapters. He is a founding member of the Indian Society of Bone & Mineral Research (ISBMR), which he helped launch in 1997.

He is a Fellow of the American College of Physicians and the American College of Endocrinology. He has received several awards throughout his career, including the Willard O. Thomson Traveling Scholarship by the American College of Physicians, Boy Frame Award from the American Society for Bone and Mineral Research, Kentucky Colonel by the Governor of Kentucky, Outstanding Service award from the Michigan Association of Physicians of Indian Origin.

References 

Living people
1947 births
Indian endocrinologists
Medical doctors from Telangana